A breakpoint is an execution stop point in the code of a computer program.

Breakpoint or break point may also refer to:
 BCR (gene), the gene that encodes the breakpoint cluster region protein
 Break point, in tennis
 Break Point, a 2002 novel by Rosie Rushton
 Break Point (film), a 2015 U.S. comedy film
 Breakpoint (demoparty), a German demoscene party
 Breakpoint (meteorology), a location referred to by meteorologists when issuing watches, warnings, or advisories for specific areas
 Breakpoint (novel) a 2007 novel by Richard A. Clarke
 Breakpoint ("The Shield"), a 2003 episode of the television show The Shield
 Breakpoint, an indicator of a microbial organism's susceptibility or resistance to a particular antimicrobial; see Minimum inhibitory concentration
 "Breakpoint", a song by Megadeth on the 1995 album Hidden Treasures

See also 
 Breaking point (disambiguation)
 Point Break, a 1991 action film
 Tom Clancy's Ghost Recon Breakpoint, a 2019 online video game by Ubisoft